James Flanders may refer to:

 James Greeley Flanders (1844–1920), member of the Wisconsin State Assembly
 James E. Flanders (c. 1849–1928), American architect

See also
 Cam Clarke also known as James Flinders (born 1957), American voice actor